William Morrant Baker (20 October 1839, Andover, Hampshire, England – 3 October 1896, Pulborough, Sussex) was an English physician and surgeon. He first described the condition now known as Baker's cyst.

Life
William Morrant Baker was the son of a solicitor in the Hampshire town of Andover. He was apprenticed to the local surgeon, Mr. Payne. In 1858 he entered St. Bartholomew's Hospital Medical School in London and qualified in 1861.

Baker became Sir James Paget's assistant for many years. From 1869 until 1885, he was lecturer in general anatomy and physiology at St. Bartholomew's Hospital. He was elected an assistant surgeon to the hospital in 1871 and a surgeon in 1882. He resigned his post as surgeon in 1892 due to his own locomotor ataxia condition. He was then appointed a governor of the hospital.

Baker was also surgeon, later consultant surgeon, to the Evelina Children's Hospital, London and was examinator of general anatomy and physiology at the Royal College of Surgeons.

Work
He wrote a number of articles on bone and joint problems. He became regarded as an expert in renal surgery, particularly nephrolithomy. He first described the knee joint problem Baker's cyst which is named after him, as are Baker's cannula, a flexible tracheal cannula and Baker's disease a defect of the periarticular ligaments. Baker's other major contribution was his original description in 1873 of a kind of infective dermatitis known today as erysipeloid.

Bibliography
Handbook of Physiology by William Senhouse Kirkes (1823–1864). (Editor)
Statistics of cancer. Transactions of the Medico-Chirurgical Society of London, Vol. XIV.
Erythema serpens. St. Bartholomew's Hospital Reports, 1873, 9: 198–211. on Rosenbach's erysipeloid.
The formation of abnormal synovial cysts in connection with the joints. II. Saint Bartholomew's Hospital Reports, London, 1885; 21: 177–190. On Baker's cyst.
''Baker's cyst: formation of abnormal synovial cysts in connection with joints. Medical Classics, 1941; 5: 805–820.

References
William Morrant Baker Biography at Whonamedit.com. Accessed January 2008
Entry at biography center Accessed January 2008
Baker, William Morrant Entry at Merriam Websters Medical Dictionary. Accessed January 2008

1839 births
1896 deaths
19th-century English medical doctors
Alumni of the Medical College of St Bartholomew's Hospital
Academics of the Medical College of St Bartholomew's Hospital
People from Andover, Hampshire